Indoor Hockey World Cup may refer to:

Men's Indoor Hockey World Cup
Women's Indoor Hockey World Cup